On June 28, 1998, United Airlines Flight 863, a Boeing 747-400 flying United's regularly scheduled transpacific service from San Francisco Airport to Sydney Airport was forced to shut down one of its right-wing engines and nearly collided with San Bruno Mountain while recovering from the engine failure. The aircraft was able to dump fuel over the Pacific Ocean and return to San Francisco for an overweight landing, but the occurrence prompted United to change pilot training requirements.

Flight
Flight 863 to Sydney departed from San Francisco International Airport at 10:39 pm PST on Sunday June 28, 1998 (UTC: 5:39 am, 29 June). As it took off, the Boeing 747-400 entered fog at the end of runway 28R. After lifting off, the crew experienced a "loud thumping noise" accompanied by vibration just after the aircraft's landing gear had retracted. With the first officer still flying, the captain retarded the #3 engine throttle to idle, which stopped the temperature rise and aircraft vibration.

There were two non-flying relief pilots in the cockpit during takeoff; both noticed the aircraft had lost approximately 40 knots indicated airspeed after the problems with #3 engine and shouted 'airspeed' to the first officer to alert him to the potential stall danger. At that point, the stick shaker system activated and the captain took over control of the aircraft.

According to the cockpit voice and flight data recordings, rather than using the rudder, the first officer had tried to compensate for the right drift by turning the aircraft to the left using ailerons, which control the aircraft's longitudinal "roll" axis rather than the vertical "yaw" axis which would have been the correct response to compensate for an asymmetrical thrust condition. The use of ailerons also deployed spoilers on the "down" wing, which increased the aircraft's net drag and decreased its net lift.  A second activation of the stick shaker stall warning resulted. The relief pilots urged the flight crew to enter a shallow dive to gain airspeed and avoid a stall, but this soon brought the aircraft close to San Bruno Mountain. The ground proximity warning system then alerted the captain, who had since taken over flying the aircraft, to pull up to avoid striking the hill. 

By later accounts, the plane narrowly cleared San Bruno Mountain by only . The aircraft had approached San Bruno Mountain so closely that air traffic control radars briefly stopped detecting the aircraft. An air traffic controller in the San Francisco tower was conversing with one of her colleagues and said, "... Is United 863 still ... oh there he is, he scared me, we lost radar [...]" In total, the aircraft had disappeared from radar for approximately 15 seconds. Residents in houses along the flight path, in South San Francisco, Daly City, and San Francisco, called into the airport to complain about the noise and voice their fears the aircraft was about to crash.

After the near-collision, UA863 was vectored out to sea to dump fuel to reduce weight and return to San Francisco for an overweight landing. During the initial climbout, the first officer stated he had noted the aircraft was handling sluggishly and was slow to climb, which he instinctively responded to by "[pulling] the nose up just a bit more to climb away from the ground." The first officer had limited experience, having made only one takeoff and landing in a 747 during the year preceding the occurrence.

Aftermath
United revised its training protocols after the incident by implementing much more rigorous standards, which ultimately became industry-wide standards. All 9,500 of United's pilots were shown a recreation of the occurrence, filmed in one of United's simulators. As a compromise, pilots were required to make at least three takeoffs and landings in a 90-day period, of which at least one had to be in an actual aircraft. Aviation media consultant Barry Schiff noted the incident in an article decrying the lack of basic stick-and-rudder skills, especially among pilots who had never flown a light aircraft.

United still uses Flight 863 for its transpacific service from San Francisco to Sydney, but now using a Boeing 777-300ER or Boeing 787-9 Dreamliner.

References

External links

 
 

Aviation accidents and incidents in the United States in 1998
Accidents and incidents involving the Boeing 747
Airliner accidents and incidents in California
863
1998 in California
History of the San Francisco Bay Area
June 1998 events in the United States
San Francisco International Airport